Comparative genocide is a field of study that focuses on comparing and contrasting different genocides.
The purpose of this subject of study is to determine whether or not there is a pattern to the crime of genocide. The study involves the comparison of current at-risk countries, retrospective cases and the precipitating factors and the legacies surrounding past genocides.  The study of comparative genocide begins with studying an at risk country and its history of mass atrocities with an attempt to determine any sort of explanation that can be considered valid as to why genocides occur. The school of thought this study presents is that through the understanding of genocidal crimes and the making of comparisons; this educational approach can help a country's government, the United Nations and the world in the prevention of future genocidal crimes.

See also
 Cohen Center for Holocaust and Genocide Studies
 Dr. James Waller, a Holocaust and Genocide Studies professor at Keene State College
 Genocides in history
 Democide

References

Further reading
 
 
 
 
 
 

Genocide
Genocide